Cassin may refer to:

People

Surname
 Barbara Cassin (born 1947), French writer and philosopher
 Brian Cassin, British businessman
 Elena Cassin (1909-2011), Italian then French assyriologist
 Jack Cassin (born 1915), Australian rules footballer
 John Cassin (footballer) (born 1951), Australian rules footballer, son of Jack
 John Cassin (1813–1869), U.S. ornithologist
 John Cassin (1760-1822), U.S. Navy Commodore
 René Cassin (1887–1976), French jurist
 Riccardo Cassin (1909–2009), Italian mountaineer
 Stan Cassin, Canadian politician
 Stephen Cassin (1783–1857), officer in the U.S. Navy, son of John Cassin
  Marco Cassin (1859-1927), Banker and Politician

Given name
 Cassin Young (1894–1942), officer in the U.S. Navy

Organisations
 CCJO René Cassin, Jewish human rights organisation

Places
 Saint-Cassin, commune in France
 Fort Cassin, Vermont

Ships
 Cassin class destroyer, a class of four World War I-era destroyers of the U.S. Navy
 USS Cassin (DD-43), the lead destroyer of the Cassin class; served during World War I
 USS Cassin (DD-372), a Mahan-class destroyer of the U.S. Navy; served during World War II
 USS Cassin Young (DD-793), a Fletcher-class destroyer of the U.S. Navy; served during World War II

Birds
Named after John Cassin:
 Cassin's auklet, Ptychoramphus aleuticus
 Cassin's finch, Carpodacus cassinii
 Cassin's flycatcher, Muscicapa cassini
 Cassin's hawk-eagle, Aquila africana
 Cassin's honeyguide, Prodotiscus insignis
 Cassin's kingbird, Tyrannus vociferans
 Cassin's sparrow, Aimophila cassinii
 Cassin's spinetail, Neafrapus cassini
 Cassin's vireo, Vireo cassinii

See also
 Cassinoceras, an extinct genus of nautiloids